Sportivo may refer to:

 Toyota Aurion Sportivo, a sports-oriented variant of the Toyota Aurion
 Toyota Sportivo Coupe, a concept car